The Hopkins Classical School (1839–1854) in Cambridge, Massachusetts, was a secondary school located near the corner of Massachusetts Avenue and Dana Street. It received financial support from the bequest of Edward Hopkins. Staff included John Benjamin Henck. Students included George Martin Lane, William C. Lovering, James Mills Peirce, George D. Robinson, and William Robert Ware.

See also
 Hopkins Academy, Hadley, Massachusetts
 Hopkins School, New Haven, Connecticut

References

1839 establishments in Massachusetts
1854 disestablishments in Massachusetts
Defunct schools in Massachusetts
Education in Cambridge, Massachusetts
Educational institutions established in 1839
Educational institutions disestablished in 1854
History of Cambridge, Massachusetts
Private high schools in Massachusetts
Schools in Middlesex County, Massachusetts